The IBM 30XX mainframe lines are a group of lines of high-end System/370-compatible mainframes.

IBM 303X series - released in 1977.
IBM 308X series - released in 1980.
IBM 3090 series - released in 1985.
IBM ES/3090 series - released in 1988.

See also
 IBM 4300 and IBM 9370 - low-end S/370 compatible mainframe lines
 Midrange computer